The past is the set of all events that occurred before a given point in time. The past is contrasted with and defined by the present and the future. The concept of the past is derived from the linear fashion in which human observers experience time, and is accessed through memory and recollection. In addition, human beings have recorded the past since the advent of written language. The first known use of the word "past" was in the fourteenth century; it developed as the past participle of the middle English verb passen meaning "to pass."

Grammar 

In grammar, actions are classified according to one of the following twelve verb tenses: past (past, past continuous, past perfect, or past perfect continuous), present (present, present continuous, present perfect, or present perfect continuous), or future (future, future continuous, future perfect, or future perfect continuous). The past tense refers to actions that have already happened. For example, "she is walking" refers to a girl who is currently walking (present tense), while "she walked" refers to a girl who was walking before now (past tense).

The past continuous tense refers to actions that continued for a period of time, as in the sentence "she was walking," which describes an action that was still happening in a prior window of time to which a speaker is presently referring. The past perfect tense is used to describe actions that were already completed by a specific point in the past. For example, "she had walked" describes an action that took place in the past and was also completed in the past.

The past perfects continuous tense refers to an action that was happening up until a particular point in the past but was completed. It is different from the past perfect tense because the emphasis of past perfect continuous verbs is not on the action having been completed by the present moment, but rather on its having taken place actively over a time period before another moment in the past. The verb tense used in the sentence "She had been walking in the park regularly before I met her" is past perfect continuous because it describes an action ("walking") that was actively happening before a time when something else in the past was happening (when "I met her").

Depending on its usage in a sentence, "past" can be described using a variety of terms. Synonyms for "past" as an adjective include, "former," "bygone," "earlier," "preceding," and "previous." Synonyms for "past" as a noun include, "history, "background," "life story," and "biography." Synonyms of "past" as a preposition include, "in front of," "beyond," "by," and "in excess of."

Other uses 

The word "past" can also be used to describe the offices of those who have previously served in an organization, group, or event such as, "past president," or, "past champions." "Past" can also refer to something or someone being at or in a position that is further than a particular point. For instance, in the sentence, "I live on Fielding Road, just past the train station," the word "past" is used to describe a location (the speaker's residence) beyond a certain point (the train station). Alternatively, the sentence, "He ran past us at full speed," utilizes the concept of the past to describe the position of someone ("He") that is further than the speaker.

The "past" is also used to define a time that is a certain number of minutes before or after a particular hour, as in "We left the party at half-past twelve." People also use "past" to refer to being beyond a particular biological age or phase of being, as in, "The boy was past the age of needing a babysitter," or, "I'm past caring about that problem." The "past" is commonly used to refer to history, either generally or with regards to specific time periods or events, as in, "Past monarchs had absolute power to determine the law in contrast to many European Kings and Queens of today."

Nineteenth-century British author Charles Dickens created one of the best-known fictional personifications of the "past" in his short book, "A Christmas Carol." In the story, the Ghost of Christmas Past is an apparition that shows the main character, a cold-hearted and tight-fisted man named Ebenezer Scrooge, vignettes from his childhood and early adult life to teach him that joy does not necessarily come from wealth.

Fields of study 
The past is the object of study within such fields as time, life, history, nostalgia, archaeology, archaeoastronomy, chronology, geology, historical geology, historical linguistics, ontology, paleontology, paleobotany, paleoethnobotany, palaeogeography, paleoclimatology, etymology and cosmology.

See also

References

 
Philosophy of time
Time